Wendel Suckow (born April 11, 1967 in Marquette, Michigan) is an American luger who competed during the 1990s. He is best known for the being the first American to ever win a gold medal in luge either at the Winter Olympics or the World Championships when he was the surprise winner of the 1993 championships in Calgary, Alberta, Canada.

Suckow along with fellow Boy Scout and future Olympic medalist Chris Thorpe, first experienced luge on a small hometown track that (later relocated to nearby Negaunee, Michigan) remains the only full-length natural track luge facility in the United States.

Competing in three Winter Olympics, Suckow's best finish was fifth in the men's singles at Lillehammer in 1994.

Suckow retired from luge after the 1998 Winter Olympics in Nagano and went to work for Team Worldwide, a logistics firm, as an account manager in Memphis, Tennessee. He later worked as an account manager for The Terminal Corporation, a logistics firm located in Baltimore, Maryland, but is no longer in that position as of 2008.

References

External links
1992 luge men's singles results
1994 luge men's singles results
1998 luge men's singles results
Brainyhistory.com information on Suckow.
Hickok sports information on World champions in luge and skeleton.

1967 births
American male lugers
Living people
Lugers at the 1992 Winter Olympics
Lugers at the 1994 Winter Olympics
Lugers at the 1998 Winter Olympics
Sportspeople from Baltimore
Sportspeople from Memphis, Tennessee
Sportspeople from Michigan
Olympic lugers of the United States